Mark Dilley (born January 20, 1969) is a Canadian race car driver. He competes in the NASCAR Pinty's Series, driving the No. 64 Leland/BDI/PartSource Ford Fusion for Micks Motorsports. Dilley has been co-owner of Sauble Speedway since May 2017.

Early career
Dilley drove in the CASCAR Super Series from 1990 until 2006 when the series was bought by NASCAR and rebranded as the Canadian Tire Series. Dilley won the CASCAR Super Series Championship in 1994.

NASCAR Canadian Tire Series
Dilley began to race in the Canadian Tire Series in 2007 picking up sponsorship from Dodge, Wild Wing, and Leland Industries. He would go on to rack up 1 pole and 4 top fives in the series inaugural season, including a win at Riverside International Speedway.

The 2008 season was more of the same for Dilley, adding 6 more top fives and another win, this time at the 2008 Coke Zero 200 race. Dilley set a new career high, finishing 6th in series points. He spent one more season with Whitlock Motorsports before moving on to Farwell Racing. In his second season with Farwell, Dilley would pick up his third series win, leading just 1 lap at Barrie Speedway. It would be the only lap Dilley would lead all season.

In 2012 Dilley decided to run a limited schedule with his friend and 1993 CASCAR Super Series Kerry Micks in the No. 02 Ford for Micks Motorsports. Dilley, and oval expert, would race on the oval tracks, while Micks would take driving duties on the road courses.
In 2019, Dilley returned for his first full-time season since 2011, driving the No. 64 for Micks Motorsports.

Current life
Mark currently lives in Barrie, Ontario. He was the main driver at Sunset Speedway. In 2017, he and a partner purchased Sauble Speedway (near Sauble Beach) and they were planning to attempt to get NASCAR sanctioning in 2018. According to Inside Track News, Mark "has been involved as an owner, promoter and/or race director at the former Barrie Speedway and Sunset Speedway"; he was also the General Manager of Sunset for a time.

Motorsports career results

NASCAR
(key) (Bold – Pole position awarded by qualifying time. Italics – Pole position earned by points standings or practice time. * – Most laps led.)

Pinty's Series

 Season still in progress
 Ineligible for series points

References

External links

1969 births
CASCAR Super Series drivers
Living people
NASCAR drivers
Racing drivers from Ontario
Sportspeople from Barrie